José Luis Dávalos Noriega (born 21 September 1927) is a Mexican boxer. He competed in the men's welterweight event at the 1952 Summer Olympics. He won a bronze medal at the 1951 Pan American Games in the –67 kg category.

References

External links
 

1927 births
Possibly living people
Mexican male boxers
Olympic boxers of Mexico
Boxers at the 1952 Summer Olympics
Sportspeople from Hermosillo
Boxers from Sonora
Welterweight boxers
Pan American Games bronze medalists for Mexico
Pan American Games medalists in boxing
Boxers at the 1951 Pan American Games
Medalists at the 1951 Pan American Games
20th-century Mexican people